Chris Davidson (born 24 October 1971) is a Canadian rower. He competed in the men's lightweight coxless four event at the 2000 Summer Olympics.

References

External links
 

1971 births
Living people
Canadian male rowers
Olympic rowers of Canada
Rowers at the 2000 Summer Olympics
Rowers from Toronto
Pan American Games medalists in rowing
Pan American Games silver medalists for Canada
Rowers at the 1995 Pan American Games
Rowers at the 2003 Pan American Games
21st-century Canadian people